Yira or YIRA may refer to

 Yira language (ISO 639 code: nnb) a Bantu language
 Yale International Relations Association (YIRA), a Yale University student organization
 Yira (1956 novel) novel by Corín Tellado

See also

 Yira yira (disambiguation)